Michał Przysiężny is the defending champion, but chose not to defend his title .

Yuichi Sugita won the title, defeating Zhang Ze in the final 5–7, 6–3, 6–4 .

Seeds

Draw

Finals

Top half

Bottom half

References
 Main Draw
 Qualifying Draw

Shimadzu All Japan Indoor Tennis Championships - Singles
2016 Singles